Coney Island Avenue is a road in the New York City borough of Brooklyn that runs north-south for a distance of roughly five miles, almost parallel to Ocean Parkway and Ocean Avenue. It begins at Brighton Beach Avenue in Coney Island and goes north to Park Circle at the southwest corner of Prospect Park, where it becomes Prospect Park Southwest. Near-parallel Ocean Parkway terminates five blocks south and three blocks west of that intersection, becoming the Prospect Expressway (New York State Route 27).  Ocean Parkway originally extended north to Park Circle, where Coney Island Avenue meets Prospect Park, until construction of the Prospect Expressway replaced the northern half-mile of Ocean Parkway but included ramps to the edge of Prospect Park.

Coney Island Avenue frontage is dominated by mixed-use housing: pre-war apartment buildings, small shops, including many antique shops, and service businesses. The B68 bus line runs along Coney Island Avenue, connecting the Prospect Park area and Downtown Brooklyn to the famous oceanfront attractions of Coney Island and Brighton Beach. It is also one of the most dangerous streets in New York City, with many avoidable accidents happening because of poor road design.

The Brighton Beach station on the BMT Brighton Line is located adjacent to Coney Island Avenue at the thoroughfare's intersection with Brighton Beach Avenue. The 15th Street-Prospect Park station on the IND Culver Line is located at the north end of Prospect Park Southwest at Bartel Pritchard Square.

In 2021, the U.S. Census Bureau estimated that approximately 7,000 Pakistanis lived in a region bordering the street, and they made up nearly 10% of the population of the region.

References

External links 
 Coney Island Plank Road Forgotten-NY

Asian-American culture in New York City
Ethnic enclaves in New York (state)
Little Pakistans
Pakistani-American culture
Streets in Brooklyn